Pruzhany is a town in Brest Region, Belarus, and the administrative center of Pruzhany District. Its population is about 18,500 people. The town is located at the confluence of the Mukha River and the Vets Canal, which give the start to Mukhavets River.

History
Pruzhany has been known as Dabuchyn since 1487. In the 16th century, it belonged to queen Bona Sforza of Poland. She brought Renaissance influence and development of trades in this part of the Polish–Lithuanian Commonwealth. In 1589, her daughter Anna granted a town charter and the coat of arms of Pruzhany (a blue snake swallowing a baby on a silver shield). The coat of arms was borrowed from that of the Sforza family of Milan. Pruzhany was a center of pottery trade at those times. In the mid-19th century, a wealthy Polish landlord, Walenty Szwykowski, laid out a park and built a pretentious palace that houses a museum today, after a restoration. The museum has a rich collection on the history and arts of the region. Another tourist attraction is the landmark at the confluence of the Mukha River and the Vets Canal. It presents a statue of a passionate pair rising over waves. The Catholic Church of the Assumption of the Blessed Virgin Mary was consecrated in 1884. 

The Jewish population in 1900 was 5,080. During World War II, Pruzhany was occupied by the Germans from 26 June 1941 to 17 July 1944. In 1941, the Nazis herded the Jews of Białystok and the vicinity here to create a ghetto. In Aktion roundups on 28-31 January 1943, the Nazis deported 10,000 Jews of the Pruzhany ghetto to Auschwitz, via Birkenau, where the men, women and children were murdered.

In 2003, the central part of the town was reconstructed to prepare the town for the national harvest festival “Dažynki” in autumn 2003.

Pruzhany is the birthplace of Joseph B. Soloveitchik, the Torah scholar and Jewish leader. Also, the American actor Mandy Patinkin descends from ancestors from Pruzhany (as well as the nearby shtetl of Drahichyn).

Raisa Žuk-Hryškievič, a prominent figure of the Belarusian diaspora, was born in Pruzhany in 1919.

The former Pruzhany (air base) is nearby.

Gallery

See also
 Bielyja Lauki

References

External links

 Photos on Radzima.org
 Biography of Alexandre Okinczyc
 

 
Pruzhany District
Populated places in Brest Region
Towns in Belarus
Brest Litovsk Voivodeship
Pruzhansky Uyezd
Polesie Voivodeship
Holocaust locations in Belarus